Keep Left was a pamphlet published in the United Kingdom in 1947 by the New Statesman jointly written by Michael Foot, Richard Crossman and Ian Mikardo. It advocated a democratic socialist "third force" foreign policy, a socialist Europe acting independently from either the United States or the Soviet Union, against the pro-American foreign policy of Labour foreign secretary Ernest Bevin. Keep Left was a key statement of the Labour left's dissent from the 1945-51 Labour government.

See also 
 Keeping Left

References

External links
 Keep Left (color photocopy from the original)

Labour Party (UK) publications
Pamphlets
Political manifestos
Democratic socialism
1947 in British politics
1947 in the United Kingdom
1947 documents